Christopher Ellis may refer to:

 Chris Ellis (basketball), a basketball player for the Barangay Ginebra San Miguel team in the Philippine Basketball Association
 Chris Ellis (baseball), baseball player
 Chris Ellis (musician), British songwriter, composer and multi-instrumentalist
Christopher Ellis (singer) in United Kingdom in the Eurovision Song Contest 1991

See also
Chris Ellis (disambiguation)